Anthony Creek is a stream in Bollinger County, Missouri.

Anthony Creek has the name of Albert Anthony, an early settler.

See also
List of rivers of Missouri

References

Rivers of Bollinger County, Missouri
Rivers of Missouri